This is a list of higher education institutions in Sri Lanka. The Sri Lankan law on publicly financed universities, the University Grants Commission controls 17 Sri Lankan universities and other educational institutions, as higher education institutions.

History
The origins of the modern university system in Sri Lanka dates back to 1921 when a University college, the Ceylon University College was established at the former premises of Royal College Colombo, and was affiliated with the University of London. The college provided courses of study in art and humanities, science and medicine prepared undergraduates for examination at the University of London. The beginnings of modern higher education in Ceylon commenced in 1870 with the establishment of the Ceylon Medical School, followed by Colombo Law College (1875), School of Agriculture (1884) and the Government Technical College (1893).
In 1942 the first university was established in the country was the University of Ceylon which had several campuses island wide, Colombo (established 1942), Peradeniya (established 1949), Vidyodaya (established 1959), Vidyalankara (established 1959) and Katubedda (established 1972). Vidyodaya and Vidayalankara were established under the Vidyodaya and Vidayalankara University Act No 45 of 1958. The University of Ceylon was modelled on the Oxbridge formula, at its inception the university only accommodated 904 students, which later expanded to cover a number of universities and it remained as an elite-oriented university as stated by Sir Ivor Jennings, catering to a small number of students and exclusively residential. It was dissolved in 1972 to establish the University of Sri Lanka. In 1974 the Jaffna campus was added to the University of Sri Lanka.

The change of the government in July 1977 led to dismantling of the single university apparatus with the plan of establishing independent universities. With the promulgation of the Universities Act. No 16 of 1978, state university status was restored to the six separate campuses. The University Grants Commission (UGC) was also created to plan and coordinate the state university education. After that, a number of state universities were created. All these state universities are registered under the University Grants Commission, but a few come under the auspices of ministries other than the Ministry of Higher Education, in which the UGC is a part of. Most of the state universities depend on funds given by the University Grants Commission, as it is their primary and sometimes only source of funding. Therefore, the UGC has a direct control over these universities and administer the undergraduate intake. The UGC is subordinate to the Ministry of Higher Education.

Legislation for universities
Universities in the Sri Lanka have generally been instituted by Special Presidential Decree, University Orders, Acts of Parliament and the Higher Education Act 1978.

Ordinance

20 of 1942 Ceylon University

Acts of Parliament

Ceylon University (Amendment) Act No.36 1956
Vidyodaya University and Vidyakara University Act No.45 of 1958
Higher Education Act No.20 of 1960
University of Ceylon Act No.01 of 1972
Universities Act No.16 of 1978 (this Act established the University Grant Commission and a University Service Appeals Board provided for the administration of universities with their campuses and outset the six campuses of the single University of Sri Lanka, the set up under the previous Act No.1 of 1972, were converted to six independent universities on 1 January 1979)

Universities 
There are currently seventeen universities in Sri Lanka, which are established under the authority of the University Grants Commission. All the following universities are recognised bodies with university status (University charter) under Universities Act No.16 of 1978.

Dissolved universities

University of Ceylon
The University of Ceylon was the only university in Sri Lanka (earlier Ceylon) from 1942 until 1972. It had several constituent campuses at various locations around Sri Lanka. The University of Ceylon Act No. 1 of 1972, replaced it with the University of Sri Lanka which existed from 1973 to 1978.

University of Sri Lanka
The University of Sri Lanka was a public university in Sri Lanka. Established in 1972 by amalgamating the four existing universities, it was the only university in Sri Lanka from 1972 until 1978. The university was based at six campuses in Colombo, Peradeniya, Sri Jayewardenepura, Kelaniya, Moratuwa and Jaffna. The university was dissolved in 1978 and its six campuses became independent universities.

Other government universities
Other Government Universities which are established by Acts of Parliament of Sri Lanka. These universities are not recognised bodies with university status or university charter under Universities Act No.16 of 1978.

Degree awarding institutes 
Under the Section 25 A of the Universities Act No. 16 of 1978, following institutes have been recognised to award degrees.

Rankings of universities

Webometrics rankings

2018 Webometrics Ranking of World Universities for Sri Lankan universities are listed below.

See also
 Higher education in Sri Lanka 
 List of research universities in Sri Lanka
 List of colleges and universities
 List of colleges and universities by country

Notes

References

 
Sri Lanka
Sri Lanka
Universities